The 23 Mile Road–Kalamazoo River Bridge is a curved-chord through-girder bridge in Marengo Township, Michigan, that carries 23 Mile Road over the Kalamazoo River. Built in 1922, it is listed on the National Register of Historic Places.

History
Prior to construction of the concrete structure, the river was spanned by another bridge at this location, presumably of a steel truss design. The new bridge was planned in January 1922 by the Michigan State Highway Department. Calhoun County subsequently built the structure as a State Reward Bridge. Mead Brothers of Battle Creek served as contractor in dismantling the previous span and building the new bridge. Construction cost $10,353.

The bridge was listed on the National Register of Historic Places on December 22, 1999. It was eligible as one of the oldest examples of its design and for its well-preserved state. The 12 Mile Road–Kalamazoo River Bridge, also in Calhoun County, was added the same day.

Design
The bridge has a curved-chord through-girder design, a style developed by the Michigan State Highway Department in the early 1920s. The bridge consists of a single  span. The girders, which also serve as railings, have a curved top surface and, along the sides, have elliptical recesses with six smaller recesses within. The corner posts have squared caps and bases to which are attached Armco guard rails. The northwest corner post bears a bridge plate.

See also

List of bridges on the National Register of Historic Places in Michigan
National Register of Historic Places listings in Calhoun County, Michigan

References

Road bridges on the National Register of Historic Places in Michigan
National Register of Historic Places in Calhoun County, Michigan
Bridges completed in 1922
Concrete bridges in the United States
Girder bridges in the United States
Transportation buildings and structures in Calhoun County, Michigan